Puede Nang Mangarap is the first studio album by Filipina child singer Lyca Gairanod, who won the first season of The Voice Kids of the Philippines. The album, executive produced by MCA Music Inc. The album was supported by its official single, "Puede Nang Mangarap". Upon its release, Puede Nang Mangarap received generally positive reviews from music critics. The album debuted at number one in Philippines in its first week.

Background 
The album was released 25 May 2015 by MCA Music, Inc.

Single 
The album's lead single "Puede Nang Mangarap" was released on 27 April 2015. On 19 June 2015 the music video was released for the single, and the lyric video was released on 14 August 2015. The album's second single "Sa Isang Awit" was released on 6 November 2015. The lyric video of the single was released on 27 November 2015 and the music video was released on 5 February 2016.

Critical response 
Puede Nang Mangarap was met with generally positive reviews from music critics. At MYX Daily Top 10, on 29 June 2015 the album received an average score of 9, which indicates "generally favorable reviews", based on 10 reviews.

Commercial performance 
Puede Nang Mangarap debuted at number one in the Philippines.

Track listing

External links 
 LycaGairanodVEVO on YouTube
 Puede nang mangarap album on iTunes
 Official music video "Puede nang mangarap"
 Lyrics video "Puede Nang Mangarap"
 Official music video "Pangarap na bituin"
 Lyrics video "Pangarap na bituin"

References 

2015 debut albums
Tagalog-language albums
Universal Music Group albums